The Northern Nigeria Gazette was the government gazette for the British colony of the Northern Nigeria Protectorate. It was published between 1900 and 1913.

It was continued by The Nigeria Gazette.

See also
List of British colonial gazettes

References

External links
Nigeria official publications at the British Library

Publications established in 1900
Publications disestablished in 1913
Colonial Nigeria
History of Nigeria
Government gazettes of Nigeria